is a Japanese guitarist, singer, and musical composer from Kashiwa, Chiba. He came out as a guitarist of Charcoal Filter in November 1999. He has also performed as a solo artist since December 2003. His first solo album The first tears was released in July 2006.

He played guitar on the Puffy AmiYumi song Tokyo I'm on My Way

Profile 
 Nickname: Kona
 Blood group: A
 Birthplace: Ōita Prefecture
 Education: Graduation from Keio Senior High School and dropping out Keio University
 Height: 5 ft. 6in. (168 cm)
 Family: Parents and a younger brother
 Favorite musicians: Green Day, Bon Jovi, Guns N' Roses, U2, Weezer, The Beatles
 Main use guitar: Fender Custom Clapton Stratocaster

Discography 
The first tears

(July 19, 2006)
 tears
 Stop Magic
 Inori (祈り, Prayer)
 Melody
 Mokutekichi (目的地, Destination)
 Mercy Drive

Composition 
Konagawa is composing all of his songs and many of Charcoal Filter’s songs. For example, Sotsugyō (卒業, Graduation), BY MY SIDE, Niji (虹, Rainbow). In addition he composed the following songs for Takashi Tsukamoto and Satomi Yoshida.
 Boku no Koe (僕の声, My Voice) by Takashi Tsukamoto
 Grapefruit Moon (グレープフルーツムーン) by Satomi Yoshida
 Quatre Saisons (キャトルセゾン, Four Seasons) by Satomi Yoshida

External links 
 Konagawa Takahiro - Official Web Site 
 Charcoal Filter Official Web Site 
 Daiji Music - Record Label Official Web Site 
 Charcoal Filter wa Konaru!! - Serial Essay 

1979 births
Living people
People from Kashiwa
Japanese composers
Japanese male composers
Japanese rock guitarists
Musicians from Chiba Prefecture
21st-century Japanese singers
21st-century Japanese guitarists
21st-century Japanese male singers